E. J. Hopple (February 5, 1881 – October 11, 1941) was a Democratic politician in the U.S. state of Ohio who was in the Ohio Senate and Speaker of the Ohio House of Representatives 1917–1918.

Biography

Mr. Hopple was born on a farm in Crawford County, Ohio. He received a public school education, and attended Heidelberg College and Western Reserve Law School. He read law with W. C. McCullough of Bucyrus, Ohio, and was admitted to the bar in 1905, and set up practice in Cleveland, Ohio.

In 1912 he was married to Elizabeth Benoit of Montgomery, Vermont. He held no offices before being elected to the Ohio Senate. He was elected to represent the 25th district in 1912 for the 80th General Assembly. He was re-elected for the 81st General Assembly in 1914, and selected floor leader of the minority party in 1915.

For the 82nd General Assembly, 1917–1918, Hopple was elected to the Ohio House of Representatives, where he was selected Speaker.

Hopple belonged to the Masons, Knights of Pythias, and Cleveland Chamber of Commerce.

Notes

References

People from Crawford County, Ohio
Politicians from Cleveland
Ohio lawyers
Speakers of the Ohio House of Representatives
Democratic Party members of the Ohio House of Representatives
Democratic Party Ohio state senators
Heidelberg University (Ohio) alumni
Case Western Reserve University alumni
1881 births
1941 deaths
20th-century American politicians
Lawyers from Cleveland
20th-century American lawyers